Omni – Aviação e Tecnologia, trading as Omni Aviation, is an airline company headquartered in Porto Salvo, Oeiras, Lisbon Region, Portugal.

Omni was incorporated in Portugal in 1988 and has developed from a single-contract, single-client seasonal provider to a group of 11 companies, involving a staff complement of 400 personnel and an annual turnover of 90 million euros.

Business:
 fixed-wing and helicopter services
 scheduled and non-scheduled air line operations
 maintenance and engineering
 training
 consulting and sales

The fleet is maintained by Aeromec, a wholly owned subsidiary which is licensed by the local authority INAC according to JAR - OPS 145, whose technical capability and knowhow is further enhanced by several manufacturer and vendor certifications as well as repair station status.

Star Alliance carrier TAP Air Portugal has reached an agreement to sell its charter operation White Airways to Portuguese multi-sector aviation company Omni.
Details of the agreement have yet to become clear but a spokesman for Omni, located in São Domingos de Rana, confirms that it has reached a deal with TAP over the sale.

In 2010 Omni established with a Brazilian investor the Brazilian charter airline Whitejets, which will operate, as of June 2010 flights from Brazil to the Caribbean.

Fleet 
The Omni Aviation fleet comprises the following aircraft with fixed wing and rotative wing:

References

External links
 Omni - Aviacao e Tecnologia
 Omni - Aviacao e Tecnologia Fleet

Airlines of Portugal
Airlines established in 1988
Portuguese brands
Portuguese companies established in 1988